Southeastern Correctional Institution is an Ohio prison located at 5900 Boys Industrial School Road in Hocking Township, Fairfield County, six miles south of Lancaster, Ohio. The facility originally opened as a reform school for male juvenile offenders. It currently (as of August 6, 2013) houses 2,034 inmates with either minimum or medium security levels.

History 
The Southeastern Correctional Institution was originally founded as the Boys Industrial School in 1857. The facility taught juvenile offenders and trained them in vocations. The Boys Industrial School became the Fairfield School for Boys in 1964 and in 1980 rebranded as the Southeastern Correctional Institution.

References

Buildings and structures in Fairfield County, Ohio
Prisons in Ohio
1980 establishments in Ohio